Afonso Ribeiro was the first person exiled in Brazil, namely referred to in the letter of Pero Vaz de Caminha of 1500.

Biography
It is recorded in Caminha's letter that, return from the voyages to the Indies (after arriving on Brazilian soil), Pedro Álvares Cabral left two exiles on the land, one was Afonso Ribeiro and the other may be João de Thomar, but the actual identity is unknown, to walk with the Indians and understand their lives and their manners.

Afonso was condemned for deportation for being "guilty of death", that is, accused of committing an assassination. He was raised by João de Telo and was about to marry Elena Gonçalves, who, disillusioned by her fiancée, took religious vows.

It was registered by Valentim Fernandes, a royal notary, the two exiles stayed for 20 months in that land and, upon returning, told that they lived with the Indians.  It is a probability that they were rescued during the expedition of Gonçalo Coelho in 1501 and 1502.  It is also stated, not long after Cabral's return, that Afonso Ribeiro, at the height of his despair, took possession of a pirogue and he adventured out into the sea, trying to reach the fleet with men who had left him. After paddling for some time, he became exhausted, seeing only the sails of the vessels already at high sea. He was certain that he would not reach the ships.

He probably headed to Cape Verde around 1503 or 1504 and possibly later became captain of Cape Verde's Alcatrazes, which may refer to Maio.  He might have been the second captain before João de Santarém. He left the post before 1508, which was later taken by Rodrigo Varela who was the last captain of Alcatrazes.

See also
Pero Vaz de Caminha

References

Bibliography
Vainfas, Ronaldo (head). Dicionário do Brasil Colonial: 1500 - 1808. (Dictionary of Colonial Brazil: 1500-1808) Rio de Janeiro: Objetiva, 2000

15th-century Portuguese people
16th-century Portuguese people
People of Colonial Brazil